Andrei Valerievich Bashkirov (born June 22, 1970) is a Russian former professional ice hockey player. He played right wing.

Playing career 
Bashkirov played 30 games for the Montreal Canadiens, earning just three assists. He has played in various leagues during his career in both Europe and North America.

Career statistics

Regular season and playoffs

International

External links
 

1970 births
Living people
People from Irkutsk Oblast
Avangard Omsk players
Charlotte Checkers (1993–2010) players
Detroit Vipers players
EV Zug players
Fort Wayne Komets players
Fredericton Canadiens players
HC Fribourg-Gottéron players
HC Khimik Voskresensk players
HC MVD players
HC Sibir Novosibirsk players
Huntington Blizzard players
Lausanne HC players
Las Vegas Thunder players
Montreal Canadiens draft picks
Montreal Canadiens players
Port Huron Border Cats players
Providence Bruins players
Quebec Citadelles players
Russian ice hockey right wingers
Portland Rage players
Sacramento River Rats players
SC Langenthal players
Severstal Cherepovets players
Yermak Angarsk players
Sportspeople from Irkutsk Oblast